Terry Lee may refer to:
 Terry Lee (cricketer), Australian cricketer and oenologist
 Terry Lee (footballer), English professional footballer
 Terry Lee (baseball), American baseball player
Terry Lee Glaze, American rock singer